Schinia immaculata is a moth of the family Noctuidae. It is endemic to the area surrounding the Colorado River in the Grand Canyon in Coconino County, Arizona.

The wingspan is about 20 mm. Adults are on wing from April to May.

The larval food plant is unknown, but the vegetation in the areas where it is found are dominated by Tamarix Prosopis, Acacia and desert shrubs.

External links
Images
A new species of Schinia Hübner from riparian habitats in the Grand Canyon (Lepidoptera: Noctuidae: Heliothinae)

Schinia
Moths of North America
Moths described in 2004